Miranda Hobbes is a fictional character on the American HBO television series Sex and the City, its subsequent film spinoffs, and HBO Max revival And Just Like That.... She is played by actress Cynthia Nixon. Nixon received an Emmy Award and has received two Screen Actors Guild Awards for her performance.

Character information
Miranda Hobbes first appeared in Candace Bushnell's newspaper column "Sex and the City" as a cable television executive in her early thirties.

The television Sex and the City version of Miranda Hobbes is a fiery career-minded red-head, a Harvard-educated lawyer with a cynical take on relationships and men.  As the series progresses, Miranda's cynicism softens, particularly after she becomes pregnant by her on-again, off-again bartender boyfriend, Steve Brady, whom she eventually marries. The birth of her son, Brady Hobbes, brings up new issues for her Type A, workaholic personality as she finds her way to balance career and motherhood. Of the four women, she is the first to purchase a Manhattan apartment, which she gives up when she moves into a Brooklyn town house in the final season to make room for her growing family.

Sex and the City: The Movie 
In the feature length movie, Miranda is still married to Steve, and they are living in Brooklyn with their son Brady, who is now five years old. We learn that she is still employing Magda and that Steve's mother Mary is living in a nursing home, as she now suffers from advancing Alzheimer's. Miranda and Steve's relationship has become stale, with Miranda under the pressure of her job and caring for Brady. After a shared laugh one night over Miranda having a milk moustache, the two have sex in a moment of newfound passion, but midway through Miranda tells Steve to hurry up because she has to get up early, which upsets him.

At one of their coffee dates, Miranda tells the girls that she and Steve have not had sex in six months, and shortly afterwards Steve confesses he had sex with another woman one time out of frustration.  Although Steve begs for forgiveness, Miranda insists on splitting up, and she moves to the Lower East Side. In a moment of short-sighted selfishness, she tells Big the night before his and Carrie's wedding that they are crazy to get married because it ruins everything, causing him to leave Carrie at the altar.

Miranda wants to confess everything right after, but Charlotte convinces her it was not really her fault, but Big's. The girls change the honeymoon trip into a holiday trip for themselves. Almost a full year passes by before Miranda confesses it on Valentine's Day to Carrie about her wrongdoing. Carrie berates Miranda for wanting forgiveness while refusing to forgive Steve. Miranda and Steve go to couples' therapy, during which they decide to meet on the Brooklyn Bridge in two weeks if they want to forgive and forget what happened and start over.

Miranda starts contemplating her relationship with Steve by making a pro and cons list. She looks in the mirror and sees that she has a milk moustache. This makes her realize she wants to be with Steve after all and she hurries to the Brooklyn Bridge to reconcile with him.

Sex and the City 2 
In Sex and the City 2, Miranda is an overworked lawyer who has no time to be a mom. She feels that she's being taken advantage of at work, passed over because she is a woman. When Steve suggests she quit her job, she is reluctant but does so after she is overlooked—then shushed—during a meeting.

Although she has every intention of returning to work, Miranda revels in her free time and happily makes it to Brady's activities. As part of her break, she decides to accompany Samantha, Carrie and Charlotte to Abu Dhabi. While there, Miranda takes charge of the group's scheduling and learns an impressive amount of Arabic. She also sympathizes with Charlotte for her feeling inadequate, confessing that it's exhausting being a "good" mother.

When Miranda arrives home, she looks for and finds a fulfilling job. She is last seen at an outdoor staff meeting of the more relaxed law firm where she is flourishing and appreciated.

The Carrie Diaries
The Carrie Diarie'''s showrunner Amy B. Harris revealed that if the show had been renewed for a third season, young Miranda would have been introduced as a character.

And Just Like That...
In And Just Like That..., Miranda pursues a master's degree in human rights at Columbia University, cheats on Steve, and explores her bisexuality with Carrie's boss, comedian Che Diaz (played by Sara Ramirez).

Relationships

Skipper Johnston

Skipper Johnston (Ben Weber) is a 27-year-old website developer, with whom Miranda enters into a tentative relationship in the first season. Originally introduced by Carrie, Miranda finds Skipper young and immature, and is irritated by his romantic view of life and love, which contrasts sharply with her cynical outlook. Although they occasionally engage in an on-again, off-again sexual relationship, she never plans for him to become a serious interest.

In contrast, Skipper is terribly smitten with Miranda from the start, even going so far as to break up with a girl in mid-intercourse when Miranda calls, as he believes it means that "the woman he loves most" wants to be with him. Horrified at learning this, Miranda suggests dating other people, but Skipper, angered by Miranda's attitude, breaks it off and leaves. He is next seen when his latest girlfriend ends things with him and as this has happened a lot, Skipper is angry—attracting Miranda's attention again.

Dr. Robert Leeds

Dr. Robert Leeds (Blair Underwood) is a successful sports medicine doctor for the New York Knicks, whom Miranda meets while interviewing him with fellow members of her building's tenant board to occupy a vacant apartment. Upon Robert's arrival, Miranda is instantly charmed by him, and somewhat hijacks the interview in order to learn more about him. Robert eventually agrees to move in, and in time the two begin a short but lively romantic relationship. Despite Miranda and Robert's sparks of chemistry, Miranda cannot control her longing for her current on-again, off-again boyfriend, Steve Brady. Eventually, at her son's first birthday party, Miranda professes her love to Steve, and her relationship with Roberts ends off-screen. After a few awkward encounters, Robert overcomes his anger towards Miranda and Steve, and is last seen in the series with two scantily dressed women in his apartment.

Steve Brady

Steve Brady (David Eigenberg) and Miranda meet during the second season when Miranda is waiting for Carrie at the bar where Steve works. Although Miranda simply sees Steve as a one-night stand after they meet, Steve senses a strong connection, and he asks to see her again. Miranda refuses at first, but they become a couple after she realizes her strong attraction for Steve. The couple's difference in economic status creates tension in their relationship, and they eventually break up. However, they remain on friendly terms, often leading to a sexual relationship between the two. After Steve loses one of his testicles to cancer, Miranda sleeps with him to convince him that having one ball will not prevent women from having sex with him. This union resulted in her pregnancy. She initially decides to have an abortion without planning to inform Steve of her pregnancy. At the clinic, she changes her mind, and decides to keep the baby. Miranda tells Steve she is pregnant and will take on full responsibility, including raising the child and providing all the related finances, but Steve can visit whenever he wants and generally be a part of the baby's life. Steve later proposes to Miranda, which prompts her to yell at him that she doesn't want to marry him, to which Steve responds that he doesn't really want to marry her. Miranda gives birth to Brady Hobbes (a homage to their respective surnames), and the two try to raise him together as platonic partners, with difficulty. Miranda initially pretends that she doesn't love Steve, but when she attempts to admit her feelings for him, she discovers he is now seeing another woman, Debbie. Eventually, at Brady's first birthday party, Miranda ends up blurting out her love for Steve and, to her delight and surprise, Steve admits that he, too, loves Miranda, and that she is "the one." They kiss, and within three weeks they are back together; they remain together for the rest of the series, eventually getting married in a simple ceremony with their closest friends and family in a community garden and purchasing a townhouse in Brooklyn for their growing family. In Sex and the City: The Movie'', the pair go through a rough part whereby Steve cheats on Miranda. The couple split and then go through counselling and reunite at the end of the film.

References

External links
Official Sex and the City website 
 Archive of the original Sex and the City newspaper columns

Fictional characters from New York City
Fictional characters from Philadelphia
Fictional American lawyers
Fictional female lawyers
Sex and the City characters
Fictional Harvard University people
Fictional Columbia University people
Television characters introduced in 1998
Fictional feminists and women's rights activists
Female characters in television
Fictional bisexual females
Fictional LGBT characters in television